East Clare was a UK Parliament constituency in Ireland, returning one Member of Parliament (MP) from 1885 to 1922.

Prior to the 1885 United Kingdom general election the area was part of the Clare constituency. From 1922, shortly before the establishment of the Irish Free State, it was not represented in the UK Parliament.

Boundaries
This constituency comprised the eastern part of County Clare. In 1918, it was extended to include a small part of County Galway which had been transferred to Clare in 1898.

1885–1918: The baronies of Burren, Bunratty Lower, Bunratty Upper, Tulla Lower, Tulla Upper, that part of the barony of Inchiquin consisting of the parishes of Dysert, Kilkeedy, Killinaboy, Kilnamona, Rath (excluding the townlands of Carrowvere, Drinagh, Loughnagowan, Martry, Moanreel North and Moanreel South) and Ruan, and that part of the barony of Islands consisting of the parishes of Clare Abbey, Clondagad (excluding the townlands of Dehomad, Furroor and Liscasey), Drumcliff and Killone.

1918–1922: The existing East Clare constituency, together with that part of the South Galway constituency comprised in the administrative county of Clare.

Members of Parliament

Elections

Elections in the 1880s

Elections in the 1890s

Elections in the 1900s

Elections in the 1910s

 Death of Redmond

Notes

References

Historic constituencies in County Clare
Westminster constituencies in County Clare (historic)
Dáil constituencies in the Republic of Ireland (historic)
Constituencies of the Parliament of the United Kingdom established in 1885
Constituencies of the Parliament of the United Kingdom disestablished in 1922